Boris Pavlovich Bugaev (Russian: Борис Павлович Бугаев; 9 July 1923 – 13 January 2007) was a Soviet military pilot and politician.

Biography
Bugaev was born in the village of Mankivka in the Ukrainian Soviet Socialist Republic into a family of teachers.  From 1941 to 1942 he was a cadet on aircraft training squadrons.  He spent World War II years from 1942 to 1943 as a pilot instructor and then as an operational pilot.

After the war Bugaev left the Soviet Air Forces and worked in civil aviation. It was also at this time that he became involved in politics, having joined the Communist Party in 1946.  As a pilot for Aeroflot, he undertook several pioneering flights to explore new routes, including to India, Burma and Indonesia.

For many years Bugaev was a trusted pilot of Leonid Brezhnev, which helped Bugaev throughout his career. On 9 February 1961 he flew Il-18 carrying Brezhnev and the Soviet delegation to Guinea. Above the Mediterranean Sea, near Algeria, the plane was attacked by a hijacked French military jet, which fired twice at Il-18. Bugaev managed to steer the plane out of danger, which was highly praised by Brezhnev.

In 1966 Bugaev was appointed Deputy Minister for Civil Aviation and the following year he became First Deputy Minister of Civil Aviation. 1966 also saw Bugaev granted the honorary title of Hero of Socialist Labour.

From 1970 to 1987 Bugaev was Minister of Civil Aviation of the USSR. On 5 November 1973 he was promoted to Marshal of the aviation and on 28 October 1977 to Chief marshal of the aviation. He retired in 1992 and died on 13 January 2007 in Moscow.

Honours and awards
 Hero of Socialist Labour, twice (1966, 1983)
 Five Orders of Lenin
 Order of the October Revolution
 Order of the Red Banner, twice
 Order of the Patriotic War, 1st class
 Order of the Red Star
 Order for Service to the Homeland in the Armed Forces of the USSR,  3rd class
 Order of the Badge of Honour
 Lenin Prize (1980)
 USSR State Prize (1972)
 Diploma of the Government of the Russian Federation (1998, 2003)
 Medal "For the Victory over Germany in the Great Patriotic War 1941–1945"
 Medal "For Distinguished Labour"

References

External links
mintrans.ru –  Boris Pavlovich Bugayev (in Russian)

1923 births
2007 deaths
Burials at Novodevichy Cemetery
Central Committee of the Communist Party of the Soviet Union members
People's commissars and ministers of the Soviet Union
Heroes of Socialist Labour
Recipients of the Order of Lenin
Recipients of the Order of the Red Banner
Lenin Prize winners
Recipients of the USSR State Prize
Soviet Air Force marshals
Soviet aviators
Soviet politicians
Soviet World War II pilots
Aeroflot